Videocine Entretenimiento is a Mexican film company, created and owned by TelevisaUnivision under its Televisa Cine brand. It is focused mainly on distributing and producing films for the Mexican market, while also distributing international films to the country.

Videocine has released over 400 films, the majority of which are produced in Mexico, several being among the country's highest-grossing 
produced films. It has continually been releasing its films theatrically amidst competition with streaming companies and major Hollywood releases in Mexico.

History
Televisa has launched a then-unnamed film division on May 12, 1971, with its first film at the time being La Celestina, released in 1976. It wasn't officially commenced until January 24, 1978, as Televicine. Its first film produced under the new name was El Chanfle, released in 1979. Videocine was founded as the second film division of Televisa at the time. In 1999, both Televicine and Videocine have merged into a single company, maintaining the Videocine brand.

In 2006, managing director Eckehardt von Damm has stepped down after serving since 1994.

In 2021, parent company Televisa has announced a merger with U.S.-based Univision Communications, affecting Videocine and other of brands owned by Televisa.

Logo
The inspiration for the company's bicycle logo originated when they were used for transporting 35-millimeter rolls in the 1960s and 1970s under strict timing.

References

1971 establishments in Mexico
1978 establishments in Mexico
Film production companies of Mexico
Entertainment companies established in 1978
Televisa subsidiaries